Tommy Dunne (1932 – 15 May 2015) was an Irish international footballer.

An attack-minded wing half, capable of taking a firm grip on proceedings in the middle of the park, he began his senior career as an inside forward with Shamrock Rovers in 1951. However, when the Hoops won the league championship in 1953–54, Dunne was playing in the Leinster Senior League, although he had been kept on as a Rovers player.

At the end of that season he left Milltown to join St Patricks Athletic. The son of Jimmy Dunne, who played for Arsenal in the 1930s, he helped St Pats take the league crown from Rovers in 1954–55, and helped them retain it the following year.

Dunne's form for Pats saw him win full international honours. He made his Ireland debut against Holland in Rotterdam's Feijenoord Stadion in May 1956 in a 4–1 win . They also won the two other times he played for his country, against Denmark and West Germany in 1956. He also won 2 'B' caps in 1958.

As the captain of St Pats he led the club to success in two FAI Cup finals in 1959 and 1961. In the summer of 1964, he moved to the north west and joined Sligo Rovers. Two years later he moved to Dundalk, whom he helped win the league in 1966–67.

Dunne died on 15 May 2015 after a short illness.

Honours
League of Ireland: 3
 St Patrick's Athletic FC 1954–55, 1955–56
 Dundalk F.C. 1966–67
 FAI Cup: 2
 St Patrick's Athletic FC - 1959, 1961

References

1932 births
2015 deaths
Shamrock Rovers F.C. players
St Patrick's Athletic F.C. players
Sligo Rovers F.C. players
Dundalk F.C. players
League of Ireland players
Republic of Ireland association footballers
Republic of Ireland international footballers
Republic of Ireland B international footballers
League of Ireland XI players
Transport F.C. players
Association football defenders